The following criteria qualify a film for inclusion on this list:

 Primary plot of film regards firefighting or related fire/rescue service work in general.
 Primary plot of the film involves firefighters or their personal lives as affected by their firefighting.
 Noteworthy attention is given to firefighting activities.

This list includes documentaries and TV series.

Fiction 

 15 Minutes (2001)
 911 (TV 2018)
 The 119 (TV 1987) (unaired)
 A Dangerous Summer (A.K.A. Flash Fire; 1981)
 Ablaze (2019)
 Ablaze (2001)
 The Accidental Husband (2008)
 Always (1989)
 As the Light Goes Out (2014)
 Backdraft (1991)
 Bad Day on the Block (1997)
 The Bells Go Down (1943)
 Blue Smoke (2007)
 Burning Flame (2009)
 Chicago Fire (TV 2012)
 City on Fire (1979)
 Code Red (TV 1981)
 Collateral Damage (2002)
 Emergency! (TV 1972)
 Emergency: The Convention (TV 1979)
 Emergency: Greatest Rescues of Emergency! (TV 1979)
 Emergency: Most Deadly Passage (TV 1978)
 Emergency: The Steel Inferno (TV 1978)
 Emergency: Survival on Charter #220 (TV 1978)
 Emergency: What's a Nice Girl Like You Doing... (TV 1979)
 The Fallen (2009)
 False Alarms (1936)
 Fire! (1901)
 Fire! (TV 1977)
 The Fire Alarm (1935)
 The Fire Brigade (1926)
 Fire Cheese (1941)
 Fire on Kelly Mountain (TV 1973)
 Fire Serpent (TV 2007)
 Fire, Trapped on the 37th Floor (TV 1991)
 Firefight (2003)
 Firefighter (TV 1986)
 Firefighter (TV 2005)
 The Firefighters (British, 1975)
 Firehouse (TV 1974)
 Firehouse (1987)
 Firehouse (1997)
 Firehouse Dog (2007)
 The Fireman (1916)
 Fireproof (2008)
 Fires Were Started (A.K.A. I Was a Fireman; 1943)
 Firestorm (1998)
 Flames (1932)
 Flat Foot Stooges (1938)
 Frequency (2000)
 The Garage (A.K.A. Fire Chief; 1920)
 Going to the Fire (1896, Edison Films)
 The Guys (2002)
 H.E.L.P. (TV 1990)
 Heart of Fire (TV 1997)
 Heaven's Fire (TV 1999)
 Hellfighters (1968)
 Heroes of the Flames (1931)
 Holy Joe (1999)
 Hook and Ladder (1932)
 I Do (But I Don't) (2004)
 In Old Chicago (1937)
 I Now Pronounce You Chuck and Larry (2007)
 Inferno (2001)
 Into the Fire (TV 2005)
 Juvenile Fire Department (1903)
 Ladder 49 (2004)
 Life of an American Fireman (1903)
 Lifeline (1997, Hong Kong)
 London's Burning (television film and series, 1986)
 Mickey's Fire Brigade (1935)
 The Morning Alarm (1896)
 A Morning Alarm (1896, Edison Films)
 On Fire (1987)
 On Fire (1996, Hong Kong)
 One True Love (2000, Lifetime Movie)
 Only the Brave (2017)
 Out of Inferno (2013, Hong Kong)
 Pine Canyon Is Burning (1977)
 Planes: Fire & Rescue (2014)
 Playing with Fire (1985)
 Playing with Fire (2008)
 Playing with Fire (2019)
 Point of Origin (TV 2002)
 Promare (2019)
 Pyromaniac (2016, Norway) (Pyromanen)
 Quarantine (2008)
 Red Skies of Montana (1952)
 Rescue 8 (1958)
 Rescue Me (TV 2004)
 Rookie Fireman (1950)
 Roxanne (1987)
 Scorched (2008)
 She Loved a Fireman (1937)
 Smoke Jumpers (A.K.A. In the Line of Duty: Smoke Jumpers; 1996)
 Skyscraper (2018)
 Station 19 (TV 2018)
 Superfire (TV 2002)
 The Tower (2012 South Korean Film)
 The Towering Inferno (1974)
 Third Watch (TV 1999)
 Trapped in a Forest Fire (1913)
 Trespass (1992)
 Trial by Fire (A.K.A. Smoke Jumper; 2008)
 Turk 182 (1985)
 Turn Out of the Cardiff Fire Brigade (1924)
 Where's That Fire? (1940)

Non-fiction 

 102 Minutes that Changed America (TV 2008)
 343 (2007)
 9/11 (TV 2002)
 9/11: The Falling Man (TV 2006)

Ablaze (2019 film), a New Zealand telemovie
 America Burning: The Yarnell Hill Fire Tragedy and the Nation's Wildfire Crisis (Weather Channel 2014)

 Angels Too Soon (WTTV 2003)
 Answering the Call: Ground Zero's Volunteers (TV 2006)
 The Big Burn (PBS 2019)
 Brave Are The Fallen (2020)
 "The Bronx is Burning" (episode of Man Alive, TV 1972, BBC)
 Brotherhood: Life in the FDNY (2005)
 Burn (2012)
 Burned: The Science of Arson (TV: 20/20 Episode May 7, 2010)
 Crash Landing: The Rescue of Flight 232 (A.K.A. A Thousand Heroes, TV 1992)
 Detroit on Fire: A Documentary (Constance York 2011)
 Dust to Dust: The Health Effects of 9/11 (TV 2006)
 Escape: Because Accidents Happen: Fire (NOVA 1999)
 "Fire Wars" (episode of NOVA, TV 2002)
 Firefighters: Brothers in Battle (1991)
 Firehouse USA: Boston (TV 2005)
 Fires of Kuwait (1992)
 Firestorm: Last Stand at Yellowstone (TV 2006)
 First In (TV)
 A Good Job: Stories of the FDNY (TV 2014 HBO)
 How to Survive a Disaster (BBC Horizon 2 2008)
 Hunt for the Serial Arsonist (NOVA 1995)
 Into the Fire (2007)
 Modern Marvels "Firefighting! Extreme Conditions" (S12E72 TV: History Channel 2004)
 Modern Marvels "Oil Firefighting" (S11E08 TV: History Channel 2004)
 Modern Marvels "The Arson Detectives" (S11E46 TV: History Channel 2004)
 New York's Bravest - A Firefighting Odyssey (2005)
 Only the Brave (2017)
 Pyromania (TV Mania, S01E03)
 Q.E.D. The Burning Question: A Case of Spontaneous Human Combustion (BBC TV 1998)
 Ricky's Rib Shack, a Firefighter's Journey (2008)
 The Academy: Orange County Fire Authority Recruit Class 36 (FOX reality TV 2009)
 The Price of Fire. National film board of Canada. 1960. Excellent educational documentary.
 The Triangle Factory Fire Scandal (1979)
 Toxic Hot Seat (HBO 2013)
 Toxic Soup: The Politics of Pollution (2011)
 Triangle Fire (PBS American Experience 2011)
 Tunnel Inferno: Mont Blanc Tunnel Fire (TV Seconds From Disaster S01E02)
 Twin Towers (2002)
 Without Warning: Terror in the Towers (TV 1993)
 World Trade Center (2006)
 The Women of Ground Zero'' (2002)

References 

Films

Firefighting